More Sightings is an album by saxophonist George Adams and trumpeter Marvin "Hannibal" Peterson which was recorded in Switzerland in 1984 and released on the Enja label.

Reception

The AllMusic review by Scott Yanow stated "The intense tenor saxophonist George Adams teams up with trumpeter Marvin "Hannibal" Peterson, guitarist John Schofield and an alert rhythm section... The music has its strong moments, although nothing all that memorable occurs".

Track listing
 "More Sightings" (George Adams) – 5:00
 "Don't Take Your Love From Me" (Henry Nemo) – 6:47
 "Soul Brother" ("Hannibal" Marvin Peterson) – 7:33
 "Do We Know Where We Are Going?" (John Scofield) – 5:07
 "Melanie" (Peterson) – 8:57
 "I Could Really Go for You" (Adams) – 6:48

Personnel
George Adams – tenor saxophone, vocal 
Marvin "Hannibal" Peterson – trumpet
John Scofield – guitar
Ron Burton – piano
Walter Schmocker – bass
Allen Nelson – drums

References

1984 live albums
George Adams (musician) live albums
Enja Records live albums